Life at the Top is a 1965 British drama film, a production of Romulus Films released by Columbia Pictures. The screenplay was by Mordecai Richler, based on the 1962 novel Life at the Top by John Braine, and is a sequel to the film Room at the Top (1959). It was directed by Ted Kotcheff and produced by James Woolf, with William Kirby as associate producer. The music score was by Richard Addinsell and the cinematography by Oswald Morris.  The film's art director, Edward Marshall, received a 1966 BAFTA Award nomination.

The film stars Laurence Harvey, once again playing Joe Lampton, with Jean Simmons, Honor Blackman and Michael Craig. Four actors reprised their roles from Room at the Top: Harvey, Donald Wolfit, Ambrosine Phillpotts and Allan Cuthbertson.

Background
In Room at the Top, Joe Lampton's escape from his working-class background through his seduction of, and marriage to, the daughter of a wealthy mill owner had been portrayed.

Ten years on, Joe is living the dream of the successful young executive, complete with luxurious suburban house, white S-type Jaguar, and two young children. However, Joe's life is not the dream it appears to be.

Plot
Joe's father-in-law, Abe Brown, is the mayor of the town, and mill owner (Illingworths, Thornton Rd, Bradford). To Joe's disapproval, Abe insists on sending Joe's children to a private boarding school. Joe's son is also unhappy about this and when Joe invites in the paper-boy in for a cup of tea, his son looks jealously on.

Joe goes to a sherry party with his wife, but would rather be in the pub. The party is in the huge house of his father-in-law. There he meets Norah.

Joe says goodbye to his son at the railway station. Later that night at his in-laws, rather than himself, choose which carpet will be in Joe's house.

Joe no longer makes love to his wife and she is having an affair with Joe's married friend.

Joe goes to the Savoy Hotel in London with his friend for lunch with Tiffield. After Tiffield leaves they go to a strip show and the friend discusses dodgy business deals.

Joe meets George Aisgill and they discuss how Joe caused the death of his wife, but he has a new love - Norah.

Joe goes home wearing a Huckleberry Hound mask and finds signs of another man being in the house. He hears the other man in the bedroom with his wife but does not enter. He is sitting downstairs when they come down for a drink.

Cast

See also
 Man at the Top, a 1970 TV series featuring Joe Lampton in later life.

References

External links
 
 
 

1965 films
1965 drama films
British drama films
British black-and-white films
Columbia Pictures films
Films based on works by John Braine
Films directed by Ted Kotcheff
British sequel films
Films set in Yorkshire
Films scored by Richard Addinsell
Films based on British novels
1960s English-language films
1960s British films